Océane Dodin was the defending champion, but chose not to participate.

Mihaela Buzărnescu won the title, defeating Alison Van Uytvanck in the final, 6–4, 6–2.

Seeds

Draw

Finals

Top half

Bottom half

References
Main Draw

Internationaux Féminins de la Vienne - Singles